Blair Timmothy Longley (born September 25, 1950) is a Canadian politician and activist.

Early life
Blair Longley was born on September 25, 1950, in Vancouver, British Columbia and grew up in North Vancouver.

Career
Longley attended the founding meeting of the Green Party of Canada at Carleton University in November 1983. He went on to be an active member of the Rhinoceros Party of which he was an official agent from 1985 to 1987.

He joined the Marijuana Party shortly after its foundation and became the party's leader in 2004, following the resignation of Marc-Boris St-Maurice.

He has been a candidate for the House of Commons of Canada on four occasions, with three different party labels. He ran for the Green Party in the 1984 election in the riding of Burnaby placing a distant fourth of four candidates with 364 of 58,991 votes. In 1988 he ran against opposition leader John Turner, with no party affiliation, and placed ninth of twelve candidates with 52 of 54,654 votes.

Longley ran for the Bloc Pot in the 2003 Quebec provincial election. He later ran for the Marijuana Party in the riding of North Okanagan—Shuswap in 2004 and placed fifth of eight candidates with 492 of 51,765 votes, then in 2008 in the riding of Hochelaga, Quebec, placing eighth of nine with 183 of 45,683 votes.

Following the legalization of cannabis in Canada, Longley said it was "going to be harder than ever now for the Marijuana Party to exist". Only four candidates ran for the Marijuana Party in the 2019 federal election. Longley is currently the Marijuana Party's chief agent, in addition to being the Party's leader, and so is ineligible to run in federal elections. Since legalization, Longley has shifted the Marijuana Party's message towards scrutinizing the "rapid capitalization" of the drug.

Electoral record

See also
 2008 Canadian federal election

References 

1950 births
Living people
British Columbia candidates for Member of Parliament
Canadian cannabis activists
Candidates in the 2004 Canadian federal election
Candidates in the 2008 Canadian federal election
Cannabis political party politicians
Green Party of Canada candidates in the 1984 Canadian federal election
Independent candidates in the 1988 Canadian federal election
Marijuana Party (Canada) politicians
Politicians from Vancouver
Quebec candidates for Member of Parliament